Yuruga is a rural locality in the Shire of Hinchinbrook, Queensland, Australia. In the  Yuruga had a population of 73 people.

History 
In 1870, British colonist John Allingham took up land in the region and named the property Waterview. He experienced much conflict and resistance from the local Aboriginal people and in 1871 a large Native Police barracks was established at Waterview. In 1873 the barracks was moved to Gedge's Crossing on the Herbert River.

In 1925, the name of the locality was changed from Waterview to Yuruga.

Waterview State School opened on 8 May 1919. In 1930 it was renamed Yuruga State School. It closed on 16 December 1994. It was at 20 Yuruga School Road.

In the  Yuruga had a population of 73 people.

References 

Shire of Hinchinbrook
Localities in Queensland